Polycera melanosticta is a species of sea slug, a nudibranch, a shell-less marine gastropod mollusc in the family Polyceridae.

Distribution 
This species was described from ten specimens collected from underneath a paint raft at Devonport Naval Base, Waitemata Harbour, Auckland, New Zealand.

Ecology
Polycera melanosticta feeds on Bugula neritina and Bugula stolonifera.

References

Polyceridae
Gastropods described in 1996